Heterotemna is a genus of carrion beetles in the tribe Silphini. It contains the following species:

Heterotemna britoi Garcia & Perez, 1996
Heterotemna figurata Brulle, 1839
Heterotemna tenuicornis Brulle, 1836

References

Silphidae